Mycobacterium colombiense is a species of the phylum Actinomycetota (Gram-positive bacteria with high guanine and cytosine content, one of the dominant phyla of all bacteria), belonging to the genus Mycobacterium.

Etymology: colombiense, pertaining to Colombia, the South American country where the strains were first isolated.

Type strain
10B = CECT 3035 = CIP 108962 = 	DSM 45105

References

MURCIA,M., et al. 2006. Mycobacterium colombiense sp. nov., a novel member of the Mycobacterium avium complex and description of MAC-X as a new ITS genetic variant. Int. J. Syst. Evol. Microbiol., 2006, 56, 2049–2054.

External links
Type strain of Mycobacterium colombiense at BacDive -  the Bacterial Diversity Metadatabase

Acid-fast bacilli
colombiense
Bacteria described in 2006